Andreas Samland (born 1974 in Oelde) is a German film maker.

Awards
 Best Short Film for Der Blindgänger - Brooklyn International Film Festival 2004
 Best Short Film for Tag 26- Brooklyn International Film Festival 2003

Filmography
Der Blindgänger (English: The Dud) (2004)
Tag 26 (English: Day 26) (2002)
Red Gourmet Pellzik (2001)
Der neue Hit (2000)

External links

 

1974 births
Living people
Film directors from North Rhine-Westphalia
People from Warendorf (district)
Date of birth missing (living people)